Matt Tuttle (born November 11, 1987 in Winston-Salem, North Carolina) is an American soccer player.

Career

College and Amateur
Tuttle attended R. J. Reynolds High School, and played club soccer for the Kernersville Comets and Carolina Dynamo in the USL Super-Y League, before going on to play 4 years of college soccer at High Point University. While at High Point he was named to the Marshall Classic All-Tournament team as a sophomore in 2007, and was named to the All-South Atlantic region third-team and the All-Big South first-team as a senior in 2009.

He finished his career at High Point with 11 goals 78 games played, and holds the HPU Division I career record for assists with 16.

Tuttle was on the roster of the Carolina Dynamo of the USL Premier Development League in 2008, but did not feature due to injury.

Professional
Tuttle turned professional in 2010 when he signed with the Pittsburgh Riverhounds of the USL Second Division. He made his professional debut on June 11, 2010 in a game against Harrisburg City Islanders.

References

External links
High Point bio

1987 births
Living people
American soccer players
North Carolina Fusion U23 players
Pittsburgh Riverhounds SC players
USL Second Division players
USL Championship players
High Point Panthers men's soccer players
Association football midfielders